The 2019 Ohio Valley Conference baseball tournament was held from May 21 through 26.  The top eight regular season finishers met in the double-elimination tournament, held at Rent One Park in Marion, Illinois.  The tournament champion, Jacksonville State, earned the conference's automatic bid to the 2019 NCAA Division I baseball tournament  Among current members, Austin Peay has won the most championships, with six, while Belmont (joined in 2012), SIU Edwardsville (joined in 2008),and Tennessee–Martin (joined in 1992) have never won championships. The tournament began in 1979.

Seeding and format
The top eight regular season finishers were seeded by conference winning percentage.  After a play-in round between the bottom two seeds, the remaining seven teams played a double-elimination tournament, with the top seed receiving a single bye.

Results
Play in round

Conference championship

References

Tournament
Ohio Valley Conference Baseball Tournament
Ohio Valley Conference baseball tournament
Ohio Valley Conference baseball tournament